Lorentz is a name derived from the Roman surname, Laurentius, which means "from Laurentum". It is the German form of Laurence. Notable people with the name include:

Given name
 Lorentz Aspen (born 1978), Norwegian heavy metal pianist and keyboardist
 Lorentz Dietrichson (1834–1917), Norwegian poet and historian of art and literature
 Lorentz Eichstadt (1596–1660), German mathematician and astronomer
 Lorentz Harboe Ree (1888–1962), Norwegian architect
 Lorentz Lange (1783–1860), Norwegian judge and politician
 Lorentz Reige (born 1990), Swedish dancer
 Lorentz Reitan (born 1946), Norwegian musicologist

Mononym
 Lorentz (rapper), real name Lorentz Alexander, Swedish singer and rapper

Surname
 Dominique Lorentz, French investigative journalist who has written books on nuclear proliferation
 Friedrich Lorentz, author of works on the Pomeranian language
 Hendrik Antoon Lorentz (1853–1928), Dutch physicist and Nobel Prize winner
 Hendrikus Albertus Lorentz (1871–1944), Dutch explorer and diplomat
 Jim Lorentz (born 1947), retired Canadian professional ice hockey centre
 Lore Lorentz (1920–1994), German cabaret artist and standup comedian
 Max Lorentz (born 1962), Swedish musician, songwriter and producer
 Pare Lorentz (1905–1992), American author and film director
 Stanisław Lorentz (1899–1991), Polish scholar of music and history of art
 Steven Lorentz (born 1996), Canadian ice hockey player

See also
 Laurentius (disambiguation)
 Lorenz, spelled without the 't' 

German masculine given names
Surnames from given names